Werner Stocker may refer to:

Werner Stocker (actor) (1955–1993), actor from Germany
Werner Stocker (bobsledder) (born 1961), bobsledder from Switzerland